Orion Group is an international recruitment business working across a number of industry sectors.  The company provides permanent and contract staff to organisations across the world.

The group employs more than 310 staff throughout their 57 worldwide offices.

Key clients include Shell Expro, Nexen, Technip, BP International, Talisman, Total S.A., ExxonMobil, Fabricom.

History 
In 1987, Orion Group was established by Chairman Alan Savage, providing personnel to the rig construction yards of McDermott at Ardersier and Highland Fabricators at Nigg Bay. During the late '80s and '90s, Orion expanded with new offices in the UK and at various international hubs.

In 2001, Orion established a joint venture in Kazakhstan with the opening of its second regional office in the Caspian. Operations commenced in Nigeria in 2003 and offices were opened in other locations, including London (2002), Houston (2003), Doha (2005), Singapore (2005), Canada (2006) along with continual development in Papua New Guinea. In addition to this, in 2006 Orion Completions and Commissioning Management Services (OCCMS) was established with the launch of their completions software product Orbit.

From 2010 to 2014, Orion were the main shirt sponsors of Invernesian football club, Inverness Caledonian Thistle.

Orion Group was awarded the British Safety Council's Sword of Honour in 2011 and 2012. These awards joined other business awards including Entrepreneur of the Year in 2007, the Queen's Award for Enterprise in 2009 and Service Sector Leader 2010 for Alan Savage at the Scottish Leadership Awards. In 2011, Orion Group was ranked as the number one recruitment company in Scotland and number seventeen in the UK and in 2012 again ranked as the number one in Scotland and number fifteen in the UK.

Orion were awarded a multimillion-pound deal with Shell understood to be worth more than £75million to the business.

Divisions 
 Engineering (Oil & Gas) Jobs
 Construction Jobs
 Industrial (Power & Utilities) Jobs
 Renewables
 Mining Jobs
 Rail Jobs
 Aerospace Jobs
 IT & Telecoms Jobs
 Office & Commercial Jobs

References

External links 
Orion Jobs Website
Housekeeper Hiring

Business services companies established in 1987
Business services companies of Scotland
Multinational companies headquartered in Scotland
Employment agencies of the United Kingdom